A collision is an isolated event in which two or more bodies exert relatively strong forces on each other for a relatively short time. 

Collision may also refer to:

Films
 Collision (1932 film), a 1932 British crime film 
Collision (1957 film), a Randolph Scott western
 Collision (2009 film), a documentary film of a debate about Christianity
 Collision (2013 film), a French romantic thriller
 Collision, a multi-award-winning abstract short film by Max Hattler (2005)

Television
 Collision (TV series), a 2009 miniseries
 "Collision" (CSI: Miami), an episode of CSI: Miami
 "Collision" (Lost), a 2005 episode of the television show Lost
 "Collision" (Heroes), a 2006 episode of the television show Heroes

Music
 Collision (band), a 1990s heavy metal band
 A Collision, a 2005 album by David Crowder Band
 Collisions (album), a 2005 album by Calla
 "Collision", a song by Disciple from the album Horseshoes & Handgrenades
"Collision", a song by Saves the Day from Can't Slow Down, 1998

Other uses
 Hash collision, a computer science term
 Collision (telecommunications), or network collision
 Collision (novel), a 2008 thriller novel by Jeff Abbott
 Traffic collision

See also
 
 
 Collide (disambiguation)
 Collusion (disambiguation)